A multinational force is a multinational operation which may be defensive, offensive, or for peacekeeping purposes. In multinational operations, many countries form an alliance to carry them out.

Multinational forces include:
  Supreme Headquarters Allied Expeditionary Force (1943-1945)
 Multinational Force and Observers (1981-present)
 Multinational Force in Lebanon (1982-1984)
 Operation Uphold Democracy (1994-1995)

NATO
 IFOR (1995-1996)
 SFOR (1996-2004)
 International Security Assistance Force (2001-2014)
 NATO Response Force (2003-present)
 EUFOR (2004-present)

Iraq
 Multi-National Corps - Iraq (2004-2009)
 Multinational Division Central-South (2003-2008)
 Mult-inational Force - Iraq (2004-2009)
 Multi-National Force West (2004-2010)

See also 
 International Police
 Coalition of the willing
 Military alliance

Military units and formations
Multiculturalism
Transnationalism
Multinational units and formations